The 2014 season is Rosenborg's 24th consecutive year in Tippeligaen, their 47th season in the top flight of Norwegian football and second season with Per Joar Hansen as manager. They will participate in Tippeligaen, the Cup and the 2014–15 UEFA Europa League, entering at the First qualifying round stage.

Squad 

(Temporary work as RB)

Transfers

Winter

In:

|-

|-

|-

Out: 

|-

|-

|-

|-

Summer

In:

|-

|-

|-

Out:

Competitions

Tippeligaen

Results summary

Results by round

Results

Table

Norwegian Cup

Europa League

Qualifying phase

Copa del Sol

Group stage

Club Friendlies

Squad statistics

Appearances and goals

   

    

|-
|colspan="14"|Players away from Rosenborg on loan:

|-
|colspan="14"|Players who left Rosenborg during the season:

|}

Disciplinary record

References 

2014
Rosenborg